This is a list of philosophers of technology.  It includes philosophers from other disciplines who are recognised as having made an important contribution to the field, for example those commonly included in reference anthologies.

A–C

 Hans Achterhuis
Alison Adam
 Günther Anders
 Hannah Arendt
 Aristotle
 Joxe Azurmendi
 Francis Bacon
 Jean Baudrillard
Seth Baum
 Anthony Beavers
 Walter Benjamin
Bernadette Bensaude-Vincent
 Albert Borgmann
 Nick Bostrom
Joanna Bryson
 Mario Bunge
 Wendy Hui Kyong Chun
Kate Crawford

D–G
 John Dewey
 Hubert Dreyfus
 Jacques Ellul
 Andrew Feenberg
 Michel Foucault
 Luciano Floridi
 Alexander R. Galloway
 Marina Gržinić

H–L
 Jürgen Habermas
 Byung-Chul Han
 Donna Haraway
 Martin Heidegger
 Eric Higgs
 Yuk Hui
 Don Ihde
 Lucas Introna
Sheila Jasanoff
 Karl Jaspers
 Hans Jonas
 Ernst Kapp
 Nicole C. Karafyllis
 Douglas Kellner
 Friedrich Kittler

M–R
 Catherine Malabou
 Herbert Marcuse
 Karl Marx
 Marshall McLuhan
 Carl Mitcham
 Lewis Mumford
 José Ortega y Gasset
 Jussi Parikka
 Joseph C. Pitt
 Neil Postman
 Günter Ropohl

S–Z
 Egbert Schuurman
 Emanuele Severino
 Gilbert Simondon
 Oswald Spengler
 Bernard Stiegler
 Mariarosaria Taddeo
 Behnam Taebi
 Tiziana Terranova
 Eugene Thacker
 Iain Thomson
 Konstantin Tsiolkovsky
 Ibo van de Poel
 Jeroen van den Hoven
 Álvaro Vieira Pinto
 Meredith Whittaker
 Aimee van Wynsberghe
 Peter-Paul Verbeek
 Paul Virilio
 Langdon Winner
 McKenzie Wark
 John Zerzan
 Siegfried Zielinski

References

Technology
 
Science and technology studies